The Temple of Jupiter Feretrius (Latin: Aedes Iuppiter Feretrius) was, according to legend, the first temple ever built in Rome (the second being the Temple of Jupiter Optimus Maximus). Its site is uncertain but is thought to have been on the Capitoline Hill.

Romulus is said by Livy to have dedicated the temple to the god Jupiter after defeating Acro, king of the Caeninenses, in 752–751 BC.[At] the same time as he made his offering he marked out the limits of a temple to Jupiter, and bestowed a title upon him. "Jupiter Feretrius," he said, "to thee I... dedicate a sacred precinct… to be a seat for the spoils of honour which men shall bear hither in time to come, following my example, when they have slain kings and commanders of the enemy." This was the origin of the first temple that was consecrated in Rome. Livy elsewhere states that Romulus's temple was rebuilt on a somewhat larger scale by Ancus Marcius, the fourth king of Rome. The new building was still small, fewer than 15 feet long according to Dionysius of Halicarnassus. A visual representation survives on coins minted by Lentulus Marcellinus, a nobleman whose ancestor Marcellus had made a famous offering to the temple. The reverses of these coins depict the temple as a tetrastyle building, without any pedimental sculpture. 

The origin of the epithet 'Feretrius' is unclear and may relate to one of two Latin verbs - 'ferire' (making it mean 'he who strikes', just as Romulus had struck down Acro)  or 'ferre' (making it mean 'he to whom [offerings] are brought'). It referred to Jupiter in his capacity as enforcer of "the most solemn oaths". 

As per the passage in Livy, Romulus placed the armor of the slain Acro in the temple, inaugurating the tradition of spolia opima being dedicated to Jupiter Feretrius. This term described arms taken from an enemy commander whom a Roman had killed in single combat. Similar dedications were made by Aulus Cornelius Cossus in the fifth century BC and Marcus Claudius Marcellus, the man commemorated on Marcellinus's coins, in the third century BC. Alongside these trophies the temple held a sacred piece of flint and a scepter, ancient relics used by the Fetials in the ceremonies attending the signing of treaties and the declaration of wars. There is no indication that it contained a statue of Jupiter Feretrius.

Cornelius Nepos says that, by the middle of the first century BC, the temple had lost its roof after many years of neglect. It was rebuilt by the emperor Augustus, acting upon the suggestion of Titus Pomponius Atticus. In the emperor's autobiography, Res Gestae Divi Augusti, this project appears on the list of renovations which Augustus sponsored in Rome. During the same period as the rebuilding, Augustus inspected the contents of the temple to settle a dispute. The general Crassus had killed an enemy commander and wished to dedicate the man's armor as spolia opima. Augustus, not intending that an ambitious nobleman should receive this rare honor, declared that nobody with a rank less than Roman consul was eligible to offer the spolia to Jupiter Feretrius. All prior historians had said that Aulus Cornelius Cossus was only a tribune at the time he made his offering, but Augustus claimed that the temple held an inscription referring to Cossus as "consul". Modern historians consider this claim "probably spurious". The episode suggests to the scholar L. Richardson, jr., that the temple interior was not accessible to more than a select few Romans.   

If still in use by the 4th century, the temple would have been closed during the persecution of pagans in the late Roman Empire. No trace of it has survived into the modern era.

See also
List of Ancient Roman temples

Bibliography
Andrea Carandini, Roma il primo giorno, Roma-Bari, Laterza, 2007.

References

Jupiter Feretrius
Feretrius
8th-century BC religious buildings and structures
Destroyed temples